The Little Valentine Riveris a river in the Unorganized North Part of Cochrane District in northeastern Ontario, Canada. It is in the Moose River drainage basin, and is a right tributary of the Valentine River.

Course
The Valentine River begins in an unnamed swamp in geographic Way Township and flows west into geographic Irish Township. It turns northwest, enters geographic Stoddart Township, and reaches its mouth at the Valentine River. The Valentine River flows via the Pivabiska River, the Missinaibi River and the Moose River to James Bay.

References

Rivers of Cochrane District